Acontius (Ancient Greek: Ἀκόντιος), was in Greek mythology a beautiful youth of the island of Ceos, the hero of a love-story told by Callimachus in a poem of which only fragments remain, and which forms the subject of two of Ovid's Heroides. During the festival of Artemis at Delos, Acontius saw Cydippe, a well-born Athenian maiden of whom he was enamoured, sitting in the temple of Artemis. He wrote on an apple the words, "I swear by Artemis that I will marry Acontius", and threw it at her feet. She picked it up, and mechanically read the words aloud, which amounted to a solemn undertaking to carry them out. Unaware of this, she treated Acontius with contempt; but, although she was betrothed more than once, she always fell ill before the wedding took place. The Delphic oracle at last declared the cause of her illnesses to be the wrath of the offended goddess; whereupon her father consented to her marriage with Acontius. Antoninus Liberalis, tells the story with different names; see Ctesylla.

References

People from Kea (island)
Characters in Greek mythology